Maximilian Riedmüller (born 4 January 1988) is a German footballer who plays as a goalkeeper for SV Heimstetten.

Career

Riedmüller spent five years playing for Bayern Munich II, making his debut on 1 March 2009, as a substitute for the injured Thomas Kraft in a 3. Liga match against Carl Zeiss Jena. He was promoted to Bayern Munich's first team for the 2011–12 season, and given the squad number 24. He was released by Bayern at the end of the 2012–13 season and signed for Holstein Kiel.

In 2016, Riedmüller returned to SV Heimstetten.

Honours
Bayern Munich
 Bundesliga: 2012–13
 DFB-Pokal: 2012–13
 DFL-Supercup: 2012
 UEFA Champions League: 2012–13

References

External links
 

1988 births
Living people
German footballers
FC Bayern Munich II players
FC Bayern Munich footballers
Holstein Kiel players
Association football goalkeepers
3. Liga players
Footballers from Munich
SV Heimstetten players